Karl Erik Flens (19 March 1913 – 17 October 1975) was a Swedish film actor. He appeared in 60 films between 1938 and 1975.

Selected filmography

 The Two of Us (1939)
 The Fight Continues (1941)
 How to Tame a Real Man (1941)
 Imprisoned Women (1943)
 In Darkest Smaland (1943)
 Gentleman with a Briefcase (1943)
 Turn of the Century (1944)
 Johansson and Vestman (1946)
 Crisis (1946)
 Don't Give Up (1947)
 Private Bom (1948)
 Blondie, Beef and the Banana (1952)
 The Chieftain of Göinge (1953)
Taxi 13 (1954)
 Dance in the Smoke (1954)
 Darling of Mine (1955)
 Violence (1955)
 When the Mills are Running (1956)
 A Goat in the Garden (1958)
 The Great Amateur (1958)
 Crime in Paradise (1959)
 Rider in Blue (1959)
 The Judge (1960)
 4x4 (1965)
 Maria (1975)

References

External links

1913 births
1975 deaths
Swedish male film actors
20th-century Swedish male actors